This is a list of listed buildings in the parish of Kiltarlity and Convinth in the Highland council area of Scotland. This includes the villages of Kiltarlity, Struy and Tomich, as well as the surrounding areas of Glen Convinth and Strathglass.

List 

|}

Key

See also 
 List of listed buildings in Highland

Notes

References
 All entries, addresses and coordinates are based on data from Historic Scotland. This data falls under the Open Government Licence

Kiltarlity And Convinth